Axolotl Overkill is a 2017 German drama film directed by Helene Hegemann, and stars Jasna Fritzi Bauer, Arly Jover, and Mavie Hörbiger. The screenplay by Hegemann is based on her 2010 debut novel Axolotl Roadkill. The film had its world premiere at the Sundance Film Festival on 20 January 2017 in the World Cinema Dramatic Competition section; where it was awarded the World Cinema Dramatic Special Jury Award for Cinematography.

Plot
After the death of her mother, a sixteen-year-old girl (Mifti) becomes estranged from her self-absorbed father and controlling siblings. Lacking friends her own age, she keeps company with reckless adults. She falls in love with an older woman and white-collar criminal (Alice), with whom she enters into a sexual relationship; while finding friendship with an actress and drug addict (Ophelia). The two embark on a three-day binge through Berlin clubs.

Cast

Production

Development
Axolotl Overkill was produced by Vandertastic and Constantin Film, with financial support from Medienboard Berlin-Brandenburg. The Match Factory handled international distribution rights (excluding Germany). North American rights were acquired by FilmRise on 14 February 2017.

Release
The film held its international premiere at the Sundance Film Festival on 20 January 2017. It was released theatrically in Germany on 29 June 2017.

References

Further reading

External links
 Official website at Constantin Film
 Official website at FilmRise
 
 Axolotl Overkill at Lumiere

2017 films
2017 drama films
2017 LGBT-related films
2010s German-language films
German drama films
German LGBT-related films
Lesbian-related films
LGBT-related drama films
Films based on German novels
Films set in Berlin
2010s German films